
This production discography documents recordings released with American singer, songwriter, and producer Richard Landis shown on the album's liner notes as composer, musician, and/or producer. The recordings are categorized by industry standards and included in the appropriate section; shown and linked at right. →

The titles are presented chronologically and span Landis' career from 1970 to the present. Only released titles are included with no speculation on titles in production. Recordings that were completed, but never released, will be annotated by footnotes.

Releases

Studio albums

Compilation albums

Single artist sets

Multiple artist sets

Singles

Studio singles

Compilation singles

Soundtracks

Tribute albums

Tributes

Tribute covers

Karaoke

Holiday albums

Box sets

Gospel

Footnotes

References

Landis, Richard